The Clerk of the Senate and Clerk of the Parliaments is the chief clerk and senior administrative officer of the Senate of Canada.

List of Clerks 
 1867–1871 John Fennings Taylor Sr.
 1871–1883 Robert Le Moine
 1883–1900 Edouard-Joseph Langevin
 1900–1917 Samuel-Edmour St-Onge Chapleau
 1917–1938 Austen Ernest Blount
 1938–1955 L. Clare Moyer
 1955–1968 John Forbes MacNeill
 1968–1981 Robert Fortier
 1981–1989 Charles A. Lussier
 1989–1994 Gordon Barnhart
 1994–2009 Paul Bélisle
 2009–2015 Gary W. O'Brien
 2015–2017 Charles Robert (Interim)
 2017–2018 Nicole Proulx (Interim; first female clerk)
 January 31, 2018—2020  Richard Denis (Interim)
 December 30, 2020- Gérald Lafrenière (Interim)

See also 
 Clerk of the House of Commons (Canada)
 Clerk of the Parliaments

Senate of Canada